Kenneth Crosby (1904–1998) was a British Wesleyan missionary, a Bible translator and language scholar, who worked in Sierra Leone.  He is best known for his work in the Mende language.

Crosby was born on 12 May 1904 at Briton Ferry, near Neath in South Wales. He graduated with a BD degree from the University of London in 1927, then a BA in philosophy from the same university.  He left for Sierra Leone in 1929, though returned to Britain temporarily in 31, where he was ordained and also married to his fiancee Dorothy.

In Sierra Leone, his service included being a part of a team that translating the Bible into Mende, helping to found the Bunumbu Press, and serving as the first principal of Bunumbu Union College (now Bunumbu Teachers College).

In 1939, he was awarded a PhD degree from the University of London for his dissertation A study of the Mende Language. He wrote of the Mende language, "I was brought up on the classics and had been taught that classical Greek was the most perfect instrument of speech ever devised.  I accepted this, of course, unthinkingly and believed it implicitly until I met the Mende language.  But then I began to think differently.  I marvelled at its incredible beauty, its wonderful cadences, its skillful nuances and the deeper I went the more I learned to wonder" (Tuchscherer 1998:220).

Publications
1944. An Introduction to the Study of Mende.  Cambridge University Press.

References

 Tuchscherer, Konrad. 1998. Kenneth Hubert Crosby (1904-1998): pioneer of the Mende language. Journal of African Cultural Studies  11.2: 217-220.

1904 births
1998 deaths
Alumni of the University of London
Linguists
Translators of the Bible into Mande languages
Methodist missionaries in Sierra Leone
Welsh Methodist missionaries
British expatriates in Sierra Leone
20th-century British translators
Missionary linguists